Aet is an Estonian feminine given name, a cognate of Agatha and often a diminutive of the Estonian form, Agaate.

As of 1 January 2021, 271 women in Estonia have the first name Aet, making it the 435th most popular female name in the country. The name is most commonly found in Hiiu County. Individuals bearing the name Aet include:

Aet Annist (born 1973), social anthropologist 
Aet Laigu, film producer and director
Aet Maasik (1941–2013), interior architect and restorer 
Aet Maatee (born 1961), cultural organizer, politician and museum director
Aet Ollisaar (born 1966), textile artist

References

Feminine given names
Estonian feminine given names